DC4 may refer to:

DC4 (mixtape), by Meek Mill
Douglas DC-4, a propeller-driven airliner produced 1942-1947
Douglas DC-4E, an experimental interwar airliner 
District of Columbia Route 4
DC4 control code, see C0 and C1 control codes